John Dunne Wickhem (May 25, 1888 in Beloit, Wisconsin – 1949), was a justice of the Wisconsin Supreme Court. He graduated from Beloit College and the University of Wisconsin Law School.

Career
From 1916 to 1917, Wickhem worked in the law office of future U.S. Representative Burr W. Jones. He was later a member of the faculty of the University of Wisconsin Law School from 1919 to 1930. That year, he was appointed to the Supreme Court and remained a member until his death.

References

Politicians from Beloit, Wisconsin
Justices of the Wisconsin Supreme Court
Wisconsin lawyers
Beloit College alumni
University of Wisconsin Law School alumni
University of Wisconsin–Madison faculty
1888 births
1949 deaths
20th-century American judges
20th-century American lawyers